Under an Hour is the second full-length album from Portland-based experimental pop/rock group Menomena. The album was originally composed and performed as accompaniment for a performance by Portland dance company Monster Squad.  Consisting of three instrumental tracks, the album is considered to be an experimental soundtrack along the lines of Peter Gabriel's Passion or Badly Drawn Boy's soundtrack for About a Boy.

The album packaging contains an ironic Parental Advisory sticker for "explicit content." However, the sticker is meant as a joke; the album contains no words.

Track listing
"Water"  – 17:52
"Flour"  – 18:42
"Light"  – 17:29

References

External links
 Under an Hour page at Menomena's web site
 Collection of reviews at Menomena's web site

Menomena albums
2005 albums